Ahmed al-Gaddafi al-Qahsi (15 July 1970 – 26 July 2011) was the grandson of former Libyan leader Muammar Gaddafi's uncle. On 16 April 2006, he married Gaddafi's daughter Ayesha. According to the Gaddafi family, Qahsi, who was a colonel in the Libyan Army, was killed on 26 July 2011 bombing of the Gaddafi compound during the Libyan Civil War. The couple had three children before the conflict started, one of whom was killed along with one of her brothers in a NATO airstrike and another killed along with her husband in the bombing of Gaddafi's compound. Their fourth child, a girl, was born in Algeria as Ayesha fled there with her brothers Hannibal and Muhammad after the Battle of Tripoli in 2011.

References

1970 births
2011 deaths
Libyan colonels
Gaddafi family
Libyan military personnel killed in action
People killed in the First Libyan Civil War